The Workers' United Front was a political party in Estonia.

History
The party was a front for the Communist Party, which had used umbrella organisations to participate in politics since being banned in 1918. In the 1923 elections the party won 10 seats, an increase on the five won by the Communists in the 1920 elections running under the guise of the Central Committee of Tallinn Trade Unions.

For the 1926 elections the Communists ran as the Estonian Workers' Party.

References

Defunct political parties in Estonia
Communist parties in Estonia